Turkey Creek is a creek in Oneida County, New York. Turkey Creek flows into Oriskany Creek by Farmers Mills, New York.

References

Rivers of New York (state)
Rivers of Oneida County, New York